The Montrealer was an overnight passenger train between Washington, D.C., United States, and Montreal, Quebec, Canada. The train was operated from 1924 to 1966, and again under Amtrak from 1972 to 1995, excepting two years in the 1980s. The train was discontinued in 1995 and replaced by the Vermonter, which provides daytime service as far north as St. Albans, Vermont. Current Amtrak service to Montreal is provided by the daytime  Adirondack from New York City via Albany.

History

Previous service
The original Montrealer entered service on June 15, 1924. The train provided overnight service from Washington, D.C., to New York City and Montreal on a route that passed through New England. The Washingtonian operated over the same route in the southbound direction.

Both trains ran over five railroads: the Pennsylvania Railroad, the New Haven Railroad, the Boston & Maine Railroad, the Central Vermont Railway, and the Canadian National Railway, which worked together to provide the equipment and crews to operate the train.

When it was inaugurated, the Montrealer also provided through service to Ottawa and Quebec City.

North of the U.S.-Canadian border, in early years the train traveled east of Missisquoi Bay and through Iberville on the route north to Montreal. By the 1950s the route was rerouted through Alburg, Vermont, and in Quebec made stops at Cantic, St. Johns and St. Lambert before reaching Montreal.

The Montrealer and the Washingtonian first ran during the days of Prohibition in the United States. The Washingtonian became known unofficially as "The Bootlegger" or simply "The Boot" because passengers often carried well-hidden bottles of liquor on the southbound train. During the Prohibition years the Washingtonian was a favorite target of U.S. federal agents who would board in St. Albans and search the train looking for illegal liquor. During the 1940s extra sections of the train were added for skiers on weekends in the winter months from New York to Waterbury, Vermont.

By the 1960s, service consisted of two daily round trips: the Washington–Montreal Montrealer/Washingtonian, and the New York City–Montrealer section of the Ambassador. On September 6, 1966, the trains were unceremoniously discontinued between Montreal and Springfield, Massachusetts. Previously, the Ambassador had been an entirely separate day train counterpart to the Montrealer. The New Haven Railroad continued to operate its portion of the train between Springfield and New York City until December 31, 1968, when most passenger service on the New Haven–Springfield Line was discontinued, upon the implementation of the merger of the New Haven Railroad into the Penn Central.

Amtrak era

Amtrak began operation of a New York train, called the Montrealer northbound and Washingtonian southbound, on September 30, 1972. It made a stop at St. Lambert as the last stop before the Montreal destination. But the other Quebec stations served in the past had been eliminated. The train was named Montrealer in both directions on May 19, 1974. The Washingtonian was also Train 185, which came from New York and later, along with most other regular trains on the Northeast Corridor, folded into one NortheastDirect in 1995. The Montrealer acquired a reputation as a party train due to the large numbers of skiers who would take the train, staying up late into the night or not sleeping at all. Amtrak equipped the train with its own dedicated lounge car, outfitted with an electric piano, dubbed Le Pub.

Derailments
Amtrak's Montrealer suffered numerous derailments during its years of operation:
On January 5, 1973, the train derailed in Randolph, Vermont, due to a wrongly set switch.
On September 5, 1981, nine cars of the southbound train derailed in Hatfield, Massachusetts. No serious injuries were reported among the 328 passengers.
On February 14, 1982, the train derailed in Holyoke, Massachusetts, near the Smith's Ferry section of the city. Four people were treated for minor injuries. An investigation found that the cause of the derailment was a spreading of the tracks.
On February 14, 1984, the train derailed in Vernon, Vermont. 
On June 29, 1990, the train derailed in Philadelphia, Pennsylvania, on a curve just west of the Philadelphia Zoo. Two passengers were injured.

1984 wreck
On the morning of July 7, 1984, the northbound Montrealer (carrying 262 passengers and 16 crew) was derailed by a washed-out culvert between Williston and Essex, Vermont. Heavy rains over the previous night had broken beaver dams upstream, resulting in a  washout in the  embankment. Five of the train's thirteen cars fell into the stream, with one sleeper car buried under several other cars. Three passengers, one Amtrak attendant, and one Central Vermont Railway crew member were killed; 29 others were seriously injured. The train included four private chartered passenger cars, doubling the usual passenger load and increasing the number of injured; the resulting rescue operation involved extricating dozens of trapped passengers and was then the largest in Vermont history.

Despite the severity of the wreck, the death toll was low due to circumstances permitting quick rescue: area hospitals were at shift changes with doubled staff levels, a 2,400-person Vermont National Guard detachment with helicopters and a tank retriever was nearby preparing for training, and a large mobile crane was at a construction site in nearby Georgia, Vermont. The National Transportation Safety Board investigation faulted Amtrak for the lack of a proper cab radio and recommended changes in locomotive battery placement, improvements in baggage rack and seat cushion retention, and the use of shatterproof mirrors in passenger cars.

Suspension and return

The Montrealer was suspended north of Springfield, Massachusetts, on April 6, 1987, because of deteriorating track conditions between Brattleboro and Windsor, Vermont. During the suspension, Amtrak offered bus service (operated by Peter Pan Bus Lines) between Burlington, Vermont, and Springfield, with connecting Amtrak service in Springfield.

This situation precipitated the only instance of Amtrak seizing another railroad by eminent domain, followed by the re-sale of the track by Amtrak to the Central Vermont Railway. The matter went all the way to the Supreme Court in National Railroad Passenger Corp. v. Boston & Maine Corp., which upheld Amtrak's action. Led by U.S. Senator Patrick Leahy of Vermont and Representative Silvio Conte of Massachusetts, Congress appropriated $5 million to rebuild the track. Only the section between Windsor and Brattleboro, Vermont, was transferred, however, leaving the Connecticut River Line between East Northfield and Springfield, Massachusetts, as an obstacle.

The Montrealer was reinstated in July 1989 with a longer routing to avoid the Connecticut River Line. Although slightly slower than the old route, this allowed for safe and reliable service. A special daytime train was run on July 17, 1989; regular service began with the northbound train on the 18th and the southbound on the 19th. On November 1, 1991, an intermediate stop was added at Willimantic, Connecticut.

Montrealer service ended on March 31, 1995, amid a budget crisis. It was replaced with the Vermonter, a daytime train sponsored by the state of Vermont, the next day. The Vermonter terminated at St. Albans rather than Montreal; it was routed over the New Haven-Springfield Line plus a section of the Boston Subdivision to reach the Central Vermont at Palmer.

Planned extension of the Vermonter to Montreal
Efforts have been underway for many years to extend the Vermonter to Montreal. In 2012 the Federal Railroad Administration awarded $7.9 million to allow for the upgrade of the existing freight rail line between St. Albans and the Canada–US border. Work on this project was completed in late 2014.

On March 16, 2015, the United States and Canada signed an agreement that would allow for the establishment of a pre-clearance customs and immigration facility within Central Station in Montreal. Before the Vermonter can be extended to Montreal the agreement must first be approved by Congress and the Parliament of Canada, and a preclearance facility must be constructed within Central Station.

On December 8, 2016, US President Barack Obama signed bipartisan legislation enabling US-Canada preclearance. On December 12, 2017, Canada's Governor-General gave a royal assent to Bill C-23 enacted by Canada's House and Senate. The remaining hurdles to implementing the preclearance regime are an Order in Council in Canada, and a joint agreement between the two countries on construction of the facilities in Montreal and the service operating procedures.

References

Further reading

External links
Montrealer timetable | August 8, 1960

Former Amtrak routes
Named passenger trains of Canada
Night trains of Canada
Night trains of the United States
International named passenger trains
Passenger rail transportation in Vermont
Passenger rail transportation in Massachusetts
Passenger rail transportation in Connecticut
Passenger rail transportation in New York (state)
Passenger rail transportation in New Jersey
Passenger rail transportation in Pennsylvania
Passenger rail transportation in Delaware
Passenger rail transportation in Maryland
Passenger rail transportation in Washington, D.C.
Passenger rail transport in Quebec
Railway services introduced in 1972
Railway services discontinued in 1995